Chhotu Ram "C. R." Chaudhary (b 1948) is a member of the Bharatiya Janata Party and won the 2014 Indian general elections from the Nagaur Constituency in Rajasthan . He was named Minister of State of the Department of Consumer Affairs, Food and Public Distribution. In the cabinet expansion of September 2017, he also named Minister of State for the Ministry of Commence and Industry.He Started career as College Lecturer in Government College Sirohi, Dausa and Ajmer from 1971–1977.He is also a Retd. IAS and Ex- Chairman of Rajasthan Public Service Commission from 2006–2010.

Early life and education 

Chaudhary was born  in a traditional Marwari Family on 1 March 1948 in Dhandhalas, Nagaur, Rajasthan to Late Shri. R.L Chaudhary and Smt. Gavri Devi. He married Smt. Mala Chaudhary on 1 May 1958. He pursued his education at the University of Rajasthan in Jaipur and received a Master of Arts Degree in Geography.

Early professional career 

After completing his education, Chaudhary started his professional career as a college lecturer in 1971. He had an enriching experience of teaching in Govt. College Sirohi, Dausa and Ajmer from 1971–1977.

Administrative career 

Chaudhary was selected in the prestigious Rajasthan Administrative Service in 1978 and he left his job as a Lecturer to pursue the career of an administrator. During his tenure in Rajasthan Government he served as S.D.M, Additional Collector & Additional Magistrate at various location in the state. In recognition of his persistent and committed effort towards corruption free government and good governance he was awarded Merit Certificate in 1988 by the Government of Rajasthan in state level function of 15 August by Chief Minister of Rajasthan.

Later, he worked as Head of Department & Director in Lotteries, Government of Rajasthan from 1996-1997; Head of department and Executive Director Rajasthan State Road Transport Corporation from 2000 to 2011; and Head of department and Director in Agricultural Marketing from 2001 to 2002. Upon his promotion as an Indian Administrative Service (I.A.S) officer, he was nominated as member of Rajasthan Public Service Commission (R.P.S.C) in 2002. He served as member in RPSC till 2006. In 2006 he was made chairman of RPSC and served the commission till 2010.

Member of Parliament 

Chaudhary was elected to the 16th Lok Sabha of Indian Parliament as a Member of Parliament (MP) from Nagaur Constituency, Rajasthan. As a member of parliament he served as Member of the following committees:

(i) Committee on Subordinate Legislation 

(ii) Standing Committee on Human Resource development

(iii) Consultative Committee, Ministry of Road Transport and Highway & Shipping.

As a parliamentarian he had attendance record of 97%, participated in 133 debates, and asked 322 questions. He was one of the foremost of all the parliamentarians in terms of these performance parameters.

Union Council of Minister (Ministry of Consumer Affair,Food and Public Distribution) 

Chaudhary became Minister of State in the Ministry of Consumer Affairs, Food and Public Distribution on 12 July 2016. In his tenure during Rabi Marketing season (RMS) 2018–19, a quantity of 347 Lakh MT of wheat was procured which is highest in five years and in Kharif Marketing Season 2016-17 a record quantity of 381.06 Lakh MT of paddy was procured. A total of 83.41% of Ration cards have been Aadhar Seeded to weed out fake and duplicate ration cards. To bring in transparency in food storage and management Online Procurement Management System (OPMS) was developed by Food Corporation of India (FCI) which was used for procurement in the KMS 2016–17. So far 17 out of 19 major procuring States have fully implemented OPMS. To bring all operations of FCI Gowdowns online and to check leakage and automate operations at depot level, a "Depot Online System" has been launched in 530 depot in FCI and 156 depot in Central Warehousing Corporation. (CWC).

To modernize 31 years old Consumer protection act 1986, Consumer Protection Bill was introduced in parliament on 05.01.2018. The bill provides for settling up of an executive agency to be called central Consumer Protection Agency (CCPA) which will look into unfair trade practices, misleading advertisements etc., provision for mediation as an alternate dispute resolution mechanism to facilitate quick disposal of consumer disputes.

For effective and quick redress of consumer grievance, the National Consumer Helpline (NCH) has been strengthened. Earlier complaints used to be 11,000 to 12,000 per month while currently NCH handles nearly 40,000 consumer grievance per month. A new portal INGRAM under National Consumer Helpline was launched during September 2016 for providing a common portal for various stakeholder in Consumer Grievance Redress Mechanism. A new Bureau of Indian Standards (BIS) Act, 2016 has also been brought into force with effect from 12 October 2017.

Minister of State, Commerce and Industry (Additional Charge) 

In September 2017 Chaudhary was given additional charge of Minister of State, Commerce and Industry. The process of granting FDI approval has been erased with dissolution of FIPB. During his tenure India rank improved from 142 to 100 on world Banks Doing Business Assessment. In a boost to Make in India Campaign of Government of India A jump of 15 places was seen by India in Global Innovation Index. While in Logistic Performance index a Jump of 19 places was seen. On global competitiveness index a jump of 32 places was seen.

Personal life 

Chaudhary describes himself as a compassionate and sensitive person with deep conviction of providing benefit of governance to the last person. He is vegetarian by diet, religious by faith and a strong believer of symbiotic relation between art of spiritualism and science of governance. He has been associated with girl child education and has served as Honorary Chairman of Veer Teja Mahila Shikshan & Shoudh Sansthan Marwar Mundwa. In these institutions girls are provided education from class VI to B.Ed at a very affordable cost. Very poor and orphaned girls are provided free education.

His favorite pastime include reading, writing, travelling, yoga and Sports. He played volleyball at school, college and university level.

Constituency works 

Chaudhary or CR Sahab as he is affectionately called in his constituency Nagaur, has made committed effort for bringing developmental works to Nagaur.

Connectivity

Starting Makrana Parbatsar Railway Service 

The railway line was closed for the past 23 years. The rail line started on 19 January 2016. A provision of Rs 968 Crore has been made in the budget for survey and construction of railway line from Parbatsar to Kishangarh.

Railway Bridge Construction as crossing C-61 and C-64 

An allocation of Rs 26 Crores and Rs 29.23 Crore has been made for long pending demand.

Railway Bridge Connectivity at Nawan 

For Construction of Railway Bridge (Over Bridge Number 21) near Nawan Railway Station an allocation of Rs 33 Crore was approved.

Doubling of Phulera (Jaipur) to Degana (Nagaur) Railway Line 

The inauguration of railway line was done on 9 December 2017 at Borawad Makrana by Mr. Rajen Gohain MoS, Railway ministry, GOI. A sum of Rs 611.53 Crore was sanctioned for this project.

Installation of benches at Railway Stations in Nagaur 

A total of 138 benches at a cost of Rs 14 Lakhs have been installed in different railway stations of Nagaur for comfort of passengers

Education and sports

Indoor Stadium Construction 

An allocation of Rs 85 Lakh was made for construction of indoor stadium. The stadium was inaugurated on 18 September 2015. Also, an allocation of Rs 11 Crore was made for development of Sports facility at Nagaur, Khimasar, Makrana and Deedwana.

Construction of Toilets in Schools 

Under Swachh Bharat Abhiyaan all the Secondary and Higher Secondary Schools were Inspected. A total of 40 Government school which did not have toilets were sanctioned Rs 76 Lakh in 2014-15 out of MP Fund for the first time.

Opening of Kendriya Vidyalaya 

A long pending demand of the city was quality education. The demand of Kendriya Vidyalaya was accepted on 12.05.2017 and 37.5 Bigha of land was allotted for it. The school was started on 25.07.2018 from class I to class VI with total strength of 248.

Financial Inclusion, Governance and Tourism

Banking 

A total of 42 Bank Branches have been opened in last 4 years in various villages paving way for financial inclusion.

Tourism 

To develop Nagaur as a tourism hub sanction of rs 15 lakh from MPLAD was made. Under this Veer Tejaji Panaroma Kharnal, Guru Jameshwar Panorama Peepasar, Amarsingh Rathore Panorama have been made

Safety 

For installation of CCTV and help desk a total of Rs 750 Lakhs were sanctioned from PMLAD Funds.

Passport Office 

A passport office was opened on 24 February 2018 in the city. More than 1000 passports have been issued in 2 months.

References

External links 
Social Media Analytics of Chhotu Ram Chaudhary

Living people
India MPs 2014–2019
People from Nagaur district
Lok Sabha members from Rajasthan
Bharatiya Janata Party politicians from Rajasthan
1948 births